The Sociedade Brasileira de Matemática Aplicada e Computacional (Brazilian Society for Applied and Computational Mathematics, SBMAC) was created on November 1, 1978 at the First National Symposium on Numerical Analysis, held on the premises of the Institute of Exact Sciences, Federal University of Minas Gerais, in Belo Horizonte, Minas Gerais.
At that time was also appointed the Organizing Committee in charge of dealing with administrative procedures for the installation and operation of the company, as well as the preparation of preliminary design of the Statute.

The Brazilian Society of Applied and Computational Mathematics is organized for the following purposes:

To develop the applications of mathematics in science, technology and industry,
Encourage the development and implementation of effective methods and mathematical techniques to be applied for the benefit of science and Technology,
encourage the training of human resources in mathematics with emphasis on content and efficient use of available computational resources, and
Promote the exchange of ideas and information between the areas of mathematical applications.

See also
Universidade Federal de Minas Gerais

References
O Documento article

External links
Site da SBMAC

Mathematical societies